Harbour Dudgeon Lakes Provincial Park is a provincial park in British Columbia, Canada, located west of the Adams River, northwest of Celista Mountain. It was established on April 30, 1996. The park is located approximately 175 km northeast of Kamloops.

References

Provincial parks of British Columbia
Parks in the Shuswap Country
1996 establishments in British Columbia
Protected areas established in 1996